Gregor Duncan may refer to:

 Gregor Duncan (artist) (1910–1944), American artist
 Gregor Duncan (bishop) (born 1950), Scottish bishop